Godfrey Ho (Chinese language: 何志强 or 何致强, born 1948) is a former Hong Kong-based prolific film director and screenwriter. Ho is believed to have directed more than one hundred films, including over 80 movies from 1980 to 1990 before his retirement in 2000. Many of his works are now regarded cult films by aficionados of Z movies as being among some of the most "so bad it's good" entertaining movies ever created.

Aliases 
Godfrey Ho wrote and directed under different pseudonyms, and has been credited under more than 40 different names during the course of his career. In Chinese, Ho is known by two names, 何志强 and the less common 何致强. The Internet Movie Database (IMDb) gives his birth name as Chi Kueng Ho, or Ho Chi Kueng using Chinese name order; this may be an error for Ho Chi Keung, a Yale Romanization of 何志强/何致强.

Some of his purported pseudonyms include Godfrey Hall, Benny Ho, Ho Chi-Mou,
Charles Lee, Ed Woo, Stanley Chan, Ho Fong, Ho Jeung Keung and God-Ho Yeung.

Biography 
The young Ho started his career as the assistant director for Chang Cheh at the Shaw Brothers Studio for a few years and worked alongside John Woo. His first film was a low-budget production entitled Paris Killers in 1974. It was while working with Shaw Brothers where he met future partner Joseph Lai. Together, they started ASSO Asia Film, and its subsidiaries IFD Films & Arts and ADDA Audio Video.

According to the list of films attributed to him at his IMDb profile, Ho has directed at least 115 different releases, most of which contain the word "Ninja" as part of their primary or alternative titles (several titles also contain the word "Kickboxer"). The exact number of films directed and/or written by Ho is not known, even he is unsure on the subject and most of the films have been re-released under different names. A number of Ho's films were also later further re-edited by Joseph Lai into NINJA MYTH, a collection of 32 one-hour "Television Specials" released by IFD.

During the 1980s, Godfrey Ho became also associated with the production company Filmark International, the official boss of which was Tomas Tang Gak Yan. Officially, IFD and Filmark were competing companies, however Ho's actors such as Stuart Smith (aka "Stuart Steen") appeared in several films from both companies. In the later interviews, Smith would confirm Ho was indeed the director of the Filmark films such as Ninja: American Warrior and Clash of the Ninjas. In 1996, the Garley Building housing Filmark's office and other businesses burned down in the notorious fire disaster and Tomas Tang died in this tragedy along with 40 other people.

Godfrey Ho's last films to date were Manhattan Chase in 1999 (released in 2000), and the animated film Ali Baba & the Gold Raiders (released in 2002). As of 2010, he is now teaching at the Hong Kong Film Academy.

Films 
Through the 1980s and early 1990s Ho created a series of martial arts films made with a "cut-and-paste" technique, which means they were created with the help of splicing various unrelated material (including the recurring motif of ninja-themed scenes, often with little or no connection with the already disjointed plot) and dubbed together. Several of the films' titles are an amalgamation of the word "Ninja" and the title of an already existing movie, for example, The Ninja Force, Ninja The Protector, Full Metal Ninja, and Ninja Terminator. He would film footage for one micro-budget picture, and then edit and splice the shots together in a different order, adding in footage from the various obscure or unreleased HK, Thai, Filipino and other Asian movies (martial arts films, crime films, comedies, etc.) to fill the gaps, and then dubbing over the result to create a final product. This allowed him to create several Z movies with the budget of one, though it is often difficult to discern how much of the finished product was actually filmed by his crew.

Godfrey Ho used American actor Richard Harrison extensively as the lead role in many of his films. Harrison, a European B movie star in the 1960s and 1970s, agreed to act in several of Ho's films in the early 1980s, although this footage was later spliced into many more of Ho's productions without his prior agreement; the damage done to his acting career by this association with Ho's films led Harrison to retire in 1990.

Ho's filmmaking also included uncredited and apparently unauthorised use of music from Miami Vice, Fight! Iczer One, Kamen Rider Super-1, Star Trek, Star Wars, the Super Sentai franchise, Combat Mecha Xabungle, Kyojuu Tokusou Juspion, and Silent Running, and composed by Wendy Carlos, Vangelis, Pink Floyd, Tangerine Dream, Clan of Xymox, Hideki Matsutake, Steve Hillage, and Peter Schickele among others, as background score in his movies. The song "Just Like You" by Chris & Cosey was used without permission twice in the film Deadly Silver Ninja (1978) while "The Jet Set" by Alphaville was used during a fight scene in the film Untouchable Glory (1988).

He also made some more mainstream movies, such as two martial arts films starring Cynthia Rothrock: Honor and Glory (1993) and Undefeatable (1994), two La Femme Nikita-inspired female assassin Lethal Panther films in 1990 and 1993, and Laboratory of the Devil, which was an unauthorised 1992 sequel/remake of Mou Tun Fei's 1988 WWII shock film Men Behind the Sun (further followed by Ho's Maruta 3 ... Destroy all Evidence in 1994, in which Ho reverted to extensively re-using old footage).

Ho appeared as a cameo actor twice, the first time in Siu-Pang Chan's The Magnificent in 1979 and again in his own Mr. X in 1995 (in the role of Godfather Ho). Godfrey's most recent credit is a cameo appearance in Scott McQuaid's Space Ninjas in 2019, where he plays a janitor. Director Scott McQuaid noted that his B movie title was inspired by Ho's 70's ninja films and he wanted to pay homage to his work, so he wrote a scene in specifically for Ho to appear in.

See also 
 Ninja the Mission Force, an homage comedy web series.

Bibliography

References

External links 
 
 Hong Kong Cinemagic – Godfrey Ho Chi Keung
 Extensive Godfrey Ho biography on (re)Search my Trash
 Golden Ninja Warrior Chronicles, a Spanish/English fan blog
 The 13 Burning Serpent Blades of the Ghost Ninja Assassin Warrior's Revenge, a spoof IMDb profile for a fake Godfrey Ho film at Something Awful 
 Something Awful reviews of Bionic Ninja, The Blazing Ninja and Catman in Lethal Track
Profile of Godfrey Ho at subtitledonline.com

1948 births
Hong Kong male actors
Hong Kong film directors
Hong Kong educators
Hong Kong screenwriters
Living people